Marianne Stanior (1910–1967) was a German stage and film actress.

Selected filmography
 Night of Mystery (1927)
 The Cabinet of Doctor Larifari (1930)
 The White Horse Inn (1935)
 The Irresistible Man (1937)
 Hurrah! I'm a Father (1939)
 Riding for Germany (1941)
 Goodbye, Franziska (1941)

References

Bibliography 
Giesen, Rolf. Nazi Propaganda Films: A History and Filmography. McFarland & Co, 2003.

External links 
 

1910 births
1967 deaths
German stage actresses
German film actresses